The Open Management Infrastructure stack (OMI, formerly known as NanoWBEM) is a free and open-source Common Information Model (CIM) management server sponsored by The Open Group and made available under the Apache License 2.0.

Overview
OMI was contributed to The Open Group by Microsoft on June 28, 2012 with the goal "to remove all obstacles that stand in the way of implementing standards-based management so that every device in the world can be managed in a clear, consistent, coherent way and to nurture [and] spur a rich ecosystem of standards-based management products." The source code is hosted on GitHub.

See also

Windows Remote Management

References

External links
 .
 

DMTF standards
Free and open-source software
Microsoft free software
Open standards
Software using the MIT license
2012 software